Yengorboy is a rural locality (a selo) in Zakamensky District, Republic of Buryatia, Russia. The population was 736 as of 2010. There are 14 streets.

Geography 
Yengorboy is located 49 km northwest of Zakamensk (the district's administrative centre) by road. Shara-Azarga is the nearest rural locality.

References 

Rural localities in Zakamensky District